Network for Animals (NFA) is a campaign-directed animal welfare organization that financially supports and provides logistical help for animal shelters, animal welfare initiatives and raises public awareness about animal issues in Australia, Croatia, Greece, Italy, Jordan, Kenya, Mauritius, Montenegro, the Philippines, South Africa, Serbia, Thailand, Turkey, the United Kingdom, Uruguay, the United States, Zimbabwe, Australia, Malta, and Israel.

NFA's goal is to "support and provide logistical help for animal shelters, animal welfare initiatives, and importantly, raise public awareness about animal issues". The organization is funded primarily by voluntary donations from nearly a million supporters from all over the world.

History 
Headquartered in the United Kingdom with offices in the United States and South Africa, NFA was founded in 1997 by animal activist Brian Davies. Davies also founded the International Fund for Animal Welfare (IFAW) in 1969. He is known for his historic campaign to save the seals in the 1970s, which ultimately led to the ban on killing baby whitecoat seals in Canada. Following his retirement from IFAW in 1997, he remained active in animal welfare through NFA and its sister organization, the Political Animal Lobby (PAL).

Initially, NFA focused on the illegal dog-meat trade in the Philippines but subsequently increased its efforts to include a wide range of animal welfare issues in its campaigns. Today, NFA provides practical assistance to animals, while PAL focuses on political action for animals, based on the belief that fundamental improvements in the treatment of animals must involve political change. Currently, NFA is led by Davies, along with his wife Gloria Davies (Chief Executive Officer), David Barritt (Executive Director) and Paul Seigel (Chief Fundraiser).

Funding 
NFA receives no government grants and is funded primarily by voluntary donations from nearly a million supporters worldwide. NFA utilizes direct mail fundraising and online appeals as its form of direct marketing to acquire new donors or supporters and retain the level of their contributions.

Media 
As part of its efforts to document and broadcast the issues it works to address, NFA uses various media. This includes using live footage of cruelty cases and streaming the contents over the Internet and various social media platforms, giving the public a virtual first-hand view of animal cruelty. For example, NFA helped expose cruelty inflicted on donkeys and mules that were being abused on the Greek island of Santorini. In Kenya, NFA footage uncovered a slaughterhouse where 2,000 donkeys a month were killed for their skins and legally exported to China. NFA also exposed conditions at chicken farms in Turkey that breached Turkish law and international hygiene standards, as well as the illegal killing of some 14,000 dogs over 20 years in Tavşanli and Tepecik on the instruction of local officials.

NFA also produces a podcast, each episode covering a different story about animals.

Campaigns 
NFA runs and funds projects and advocacy work in at least 19 countries around the world.

Horse fighting 
NFA is instrumental in the fight against the illegal practice of organized horse fighting in Mindanao, in the Southern Philippines. As an incentive to stop horse fighting, NFA provides free veterinary clinics in communities where horse fighting is prevalent on the condition the horses are not used in fights. NFA regularly persuades television stations and newspapers to cover the horse-fighting issue, reaching hundreds of thousands of people. Additionally, NFA prints and distributes educational leaflets and posters in horse fighting areas, give presentations to veterinarians, schools, and civic groups, and when funding allows, runs advertisements in newspapers.

Donkeys 
In Zimbabwe, NFA works with MARES, a donkey sanctuary in Bulawayo that combats cruelty, rescues donkeys, and fights to end the donkey skin trade.  In Kenya, NFA cooperates with the Kenyan Society for the Prevention of Cruelty to Animals (KSPCA). NFA highlights the slaughter of donkeys on a daily basis and has stated that by 2023, Kenya may not have a single donkey left. Kenya has since announced that it will ban the commercial slaughter of donkeys. In early 2020, abattoirs were given a month to stop the slaughter or be shut down. NFA also works to improve the lives of donkeys in South Africa. During the coronavirus pandemic, the organization provided food to feed 250 donkeys. The organization also runs outreach programs to teach donkey owners how to take care of their donkeys in Limpopo.

Street cats 
NFA works to help street cats around the world, with support projects in South Africa, Italy, and Greece. On the Greek islands of Kefalonia and Ithaka, NFA funds spay and neuter programs and provides food for street cats. In Cape Town, South Africa, NFA supports the work of activist June Bradbury who cares for feral cats in industrial areas, and financially supports the cattery at the TEARS animal rescue shelter. In Paciano, Italy, NFA provides funding for the care and feeding of street cats.

Disaster assistance 
Alongside NFA’s campaigns for animal welfare, the organization assists animals and their owners in times of natural disaster. In 2020, when Australian bush fires killed a billion animals, NFA provided funding for specialized food and care for flying-fox cubs. In January 2020, the Taal volcano erupted in the Philippines. Hundreds of thousands of people were evacuated, and animals were left to fend for themselves. NFA provided food and care for animals in the danger area. When Hurricane Florence swept through the Carolinas in 2006, NFA donated more than $45,000.00 to rescue, care for, and reunite animals with their families. When Hurricane Harvey struck Texas in 2017, NFA called on supporters for help, rescuing stranded animals and raised $60,472.00, which was given to the Houston SPCA.

COVID-19 and pet welfare in South Africa
On 27 March 2020, the government of South Africa declared a national lockdown to combat the spread of the virus Covid-19. It was announced that only emergency veterinary surgeries could take place under new strict regulations. Fallen Angels in the Western Cape was one of several shelter-and-outreach organizations affected by the ruling. Their shelter cares for over 300 dogs, whilst also providing valuable care for thousands of strays living in townships in and around the province. With authorities estimating there could be more than 230 000 street dogs in Cape Town alone, Fallen Angels could not afford to turn their back on these dogs. NFA’s sister organization PAL challenged the ruling, encouraging South Africans to do the same and show their support for the cause by signing a petition to Government. Efforts paid off and the ban was lifted, enabling sterilization of animals in the Western Cape.

Philippines dog meat trade 
NFA, in partnership with local animal protection organizations, has led the fight to end the brutal illegal dog meat trade in the Philippines. NFA’s animal welfare campaigning within the Philippines promotes rabies awareness alongside other health concerns involved in the dog meat trade. The team regularly works in Philippine schools, and reports of NFA’s raids are regularly broadcast on Philippine news networks. The team operates a network of informants across the region, who monitor suspected slaughtering locations and smuggling vehicles, as well as organizing raids to tackle illegal trading. NFA has helped achieve major reductions in the Philippine consumption of dog meat. It is now almost unheard of in the capital of Metro Manila, and widely considered an embarrassment to the nation’s reputation. NFA has also worked on issues such as puppy mills, illegal dog smuggling, dog cruelty at the hands of children, dog fighting, and even provided maimed or disabled dogs with doggy-wheelchairs.

Wildlife poaching and exploitation 
NFA works closely with South Africa’s Addo Elephant National Park, financing a project to reintroduce the gene that produces tusks into Addo’s elephant population that has largely lost its tusks. It also provides kenneling for canine anti-poaching units in the reserve, elephant relocation and provides requested material assistance in working to make more land accessible to the animals.

Dogs In Distress campaign 
NFA’s Dogs In Distress campaign aims to give as many dogs as possible a life free of pain and suffering. This is achieved by assisting several dog shelters with funds, food, and veterinary care. The campaign is active in Croatia, Jordan, Montenegro, Philippines, Serbia, South Africa, Thailand, and Turkey. It is particularly active in South Africa financing two leading Cape Town shelters – The Emma Animal Rescue Society (TEARS) and Fallen Angels and taking part in regular animal welfare work in township areas.

See also 
 Brian Davies (activist)
 International Fund for Animal Welfare
 Seal hunting
Animal Survival International

References

External links 
 
 

Animal welfare organizations
Non-profit organisations based in the United Kingdom